Csongor István Nagy Ph.D., LL.M., S.J.D, dr. juris is a professor of law in Hungary, the head of the Department of Private International Law at the University of Szeged, Faculty of Law, in Szeged, Hungary, research chair and head of the Federal Markets “Momentum” Research Group at the Hungarian Academy of Sciences, and an attorney-at-law admitted to the Budapest Bar. Furthermore, he is visiting professor at the Central European University, the Sapientia University of Transylvania and the Riga Graduate School of Law. He is associate member at the Centre for Private International Law at the University of Aberdeen. He is admitted to the Budapest Bar and arbitrator at the Court of Arbitration attached to the Hungarian Chamber of Commerce and Industry, Budapest.

Biography 

Nagy graduated at Eötvös Loránd University (ELTE), at the Faculty of Law in Budapest, in 2003, where he also earned a PhD. During his studies he became a member of Eötvös Loránd University István Bibó College of Law and Political Sciences. He received master (LL.M) and S.J.D degree from the Central European University (CEU) in Budapest.  He pursued graduate and postgraduate studies in Rotterdam, Heidelberg and New York.

He had visiting appointments in the Hague (Asser Institute), Munich (Max Planck Institute), Hamburg (Max Planck Institute), Edinburgh (University of Edinburgh), London (British Institute of International and Comparative Law) at the Indiana University Bloomington in Brisbane Australia (TC Beirne School of Law, University of Queensland) and Beijing (China-EU School of Law); He was senior fellow at the Center for International Governance Innovation in Canada and Eurojus legal counsel in the European Commission's Representation in Hungary.

In 2014, he won the “Momentum II” grant of the Hungarian Academy of Sciences, which is awarded to “internationally recognized leading scholars, who have a steadily outstanding and increasing performance”. In the frame of this, he founded the “Federal Markets” Research Group in the HAS Center for Social Sciences. In 2018, as principal investigator he headed a consortium of universities which was awarded a major EU grant to carry out a comprehensive private international law research project in Central Europe (Cross-border litigation in Central-Europe – CEPIL, H2020: JUST-AG-2017 Grant, nr. 800789).

Bibliography 
Prof. Nagy has published more than 180 pieces in English, French, German, Hungarian, Romanian and (in translation) in Croatian and Spanish, among others, in the following periodicals: Acta Juridica Hungarica, Arbitration International, American Review of International Arbitration, Cahiers de l’arbitrage, Columbia Journal of European Law, Európai Jog, European Competition Law Review, European Journal of Law Reform, European Law Review, German Law Journal, Indiana International and Comparative Law Review, Indiana Journal of Global Legal Studies, International and Comparative Law Quarterly, IPRAX, Jogtudományi Közlöny, Journal of International Business and Law, Journal of International Economic Law, Journal of Private International Law, London Law Review, Loyola Consumer Law Review, Maastricht Journal of European and Comparative Law, Magyar Jog, Nederlands Internationaal Privaatrecht, Osteuropa-Recht, Revista Română de Drept al Afacerilor, Revista Română de Drept European, Revue de Droit International et de Droit Comparé, Revue Internationale de Droit Comparé, Wirtschaft und Wettbewerb, World Competition Law and Economics Review, Zeitschrift für Europarecht, Internationales Privatrecht und Rechtsvergleichung, Zeitschrift für das Privatrecht der Europäischen Union. He is also an editor of the „Verseny és Szabályozás” (“Competition and Regulation”) yearbook (Hungarian Academy of Sciences (HAS), Institute of Economics).[5] A selection of his books that were written in English:

•	Collective actions in Europe: a comparative, economic and transsystemic analysis. Springer Publishing, 2019. .

•	Investment arbitration in Central and Eastern Europe: Law and Practice. Edward Elgar Publishing, 2019.  (as editor)

•	Investment arbitration and national interest. Council on International Law and Politics, Indianapolis, 2018. ,  (as editor)

•	The EU Bill of Rights’ Diagonal Application to Member States: Comparative Perspectives of Europe's Human Rights Deficit. Eleven International Publishing, the Hague, 2018. , 9789462749153 (as editor)

•	Missed and new opportunities in world trade. Akadémiai Kiadó, Budapest, 2017.  (as co-editor with Zoltán Víg)

•	The Procedural Aspects of the Application of Competition Law. Europa Law Publishing, 2016 (as editor)[13]

•	EU and US Competition Law: Divided in Unity? Ashgate Publishing, 2013.[11]

•	Competition law in Hungary. Kluwer Law International, 2016.[12]

•	Private international law in Hungary. Kluwer Law International, 2012.[10]

His works have been widely cited, for instance, in European Court of Justice cases (Case C-350/14 Florin Lazar[14] & Case C-373/14, Toshiba Corporation v. Commission[15]) and by Hungarian courts (Hungarian Supreme Court in Case Kfv.III.37.582/2016/16 & EH2017.20 and in Case Gfv.IX.30.161/2012/7, Budapest Court of Appeals in Case 14.Gf.40.137/2010/5 & ÍH 2011.73 and in Case 14.Gf.40.577/2011/6, and Budapest Court in Case 22.G.41.893/2009/60).[8]

References 

Hungarian jurists
Academic staff of the University of Szeged
Eötvös Loránd University alumni
Scholars of competition law
Writers from Cluj-Napoca
Living people
1979 births
Academic staff of the Corvinus University of Budapest